Belém River may refer to:
 Belém River (Paraná), in Brazil
 Belém River (Rondônia), in Brazil